The participation of Georgia in the Junior Eurovision Song Contest first began at the Junior Eurovision Song Contest in  which took place in Rotterdam, Netherlands. The Georgian Public Broadcaster (GPB), a member organisation of the European Broadcasting Union (EBU), have been responsible for the selection process of their participants since their debut. The first representative to participate for the nation at the 2007 contest was Mariam Romelashvili with the song "Odelia Ranuni", which finished in fourth place out of seventeen participating entries, achieving a score of one hundred and sixteen points.

History

Georgia's first entry was Mariam Romelashvili with the song "Odelia Ranuni", which finished fourth of 17 entries at the contest in Rotterdam in 2007. Georgia was represented in 2008 by Bzikebi with the song "Bzz..", performed in an imaginary language. The song went on to win the contest, receiving 154 points and a total of eight 12-point votes out of 14 countries, the second-highest proportion of 12 points received by a winner in either Eurovision Contests, just beaten by Anastasiya Petryk in 2012.

In 2011, Georgia won the contest again with the band Candy who performed the song "Candy Music". The song won the competition with 108 points.

At the Junior Eurovision Song Contest 2014, Georgia failed to reach the top 10 for the first time: Lizi Pop finished at 11th place with the song "Happy Day". However, the official video of the song uploaded to the contest's official YouTube channel is the second most-viewed video, only behind Roksana Węgiel's "Anyone I Want to Be", counting more than 25 million views 

In 2016, Georgia once again won the contest with the song "Mzeo" performed by Mariam Mamadashvili, making Georgia the first, and  the only country to win the contest three times. Following this victory, Georgia hosted the Junior Eurovision Song Contest 2017 on 26 November at the Olympic Palace in Tbilisi. Helen Kalandadze and Lizi Japaridze hosted the contest.

Participation overview

Photo gallery

Commentators and spokespersons

The contests are broadcast online worldwide through the official Junior Eurovision Song Contest website junioreurovision.tv and YouTube. In 2015, the online broadcasts featured commentary in English by junioreurovision.tv editor Luke Fisher and 2011 Bulgarian Junior Eurovision Song Contest entrant Ivan Ivanov. The Georgian broadcaster, GPB, sent their own commentators to each contest in order to provide commentary in the Georgian language. Spokespersons were also chosen by the national broadcaster to announce the awarding points from Georgia. The table below lists the details of each commentator and spokesperson since 2007.

Hostings

See also
Georgia in the Eurovision Song Contest – Senior version of the Junior Eurovision Song Contest.
Georgia in the Eurovision Young Musicians – A competition organised by the EBU for musicians aged 18 years and younger.
Georgia in the Türkvizyon Song Contest – A contest for countries and regions which are of Turkic-speaking or Turkic ethnicity.

References 

Georgia